David J. Danielson (March 17, 1947 – May 22, 2021) was an American politician. First elected in 2012, he was a Republican member of the New Hampshire House of Representatives, representing the town of Bedford. In 2017, he was designated the assistant majority leader.

Danielson was born in Manchester, New Hampshire on March 17, 1947. He graduated from Bishop Bradley High School in 1965. Danielson earned his bachelor's degree in political science from Saint Anselm College, and a Master of Business Administration from Rivier University.

Danielson served in the New Hampshire Army National Guard, and as an adjunct faculty member at Southern New Hampshire University.

Danielson and his wife Mary had one son. He died on May 22, 2021, of cancer at his home in Bedford, New Hampshire.

References

1947 births
2021 deaths
Republican Party members of the New Hampshire House of Representatives
21st-century American politicians
People from Bedford, New Hampshire
Politicians from Manchester, New Hampshire
New Hampshire National Guard personnel
Saint Anselm College alumni
Rivier University alumni
Southern New Hampshire University faculty
Deaths from cancer in New Hampshire